VIP Brother 2 was the second season of the celebrity version of the Bulgarian reality television show Big Brother. It was aired on Nova Television. The show started on 26 March 2007 and ended on 27 April 2007. It lasted for 33 days, 4 days longer than the previous season, because of the high ratings. The show was hosted by Niki Kanchev.

The winner was Hristina, she is the wife of the winner of Big Brother 1 Zdravko, who also participated in this season. She is also the only non-VIP housemate. Hristina won 100,000 leva.

Housemates
For the first time in the history of Big Brother Bulgaria, two former Housemates entered the House again - Tihomir and Zdravko, both from Big Brother 1.

12 Housemates entered the House on Day 1, and another 1 on Day 5.

Desislava 

Desislava Doneva is a famous pop-folk singer. She entered the house on Day 1 and finished second in the finale on Day 33.

Hristina 
Hristina Stefanova is the wife of Zdravko (the winner of Big Brother 1). Before entering the show, Zdravko proposed marriage to her. She accepted and entered the house on Day 5 with their daughter Yanitsa (who was the third child to live in the house). Surprisingly, Hristina became a winner on Day 33.

Kalin 
Kalin Velyov is a musician. He entered the house on Day 1 and was the fifth evicted on Day 29, after receiving the fewest viewers' positive votes.

Katerina 
Katerina Evro is an actress. Her father is Albanian and her mother is Bulgarian. She entered the house on Day 1 and finished fourth in the finale on Day 33.

Magdalena 
Magdalena Zhelyazkova is a model, TV host and Miss Bulgaria 2003. She entered the house on Day 1 and finished sixth in the finale on Day 33.

Nikolay 
Nikolay Parvanov "Niki Kitaetsa" is Azis's husband. He entered the house on Day 1 and finished third in the finale on Day 33.

Petya 

Petya Pavlova is a pop singer, writer and actress. She is from Sofia, but she lived in London, where she developed her career. She entered the house on Day 1 and was the first evicted on Day 12.

Rositsa 
Rositsa Noveva is a hotel-keeper. Before his death, she was a friend of Ivan Zografski. She entered the house on Day 1 and was the second evicted on Day 15.

Tihomir 
Tihomir Georgiev is a participant from Big Brother 1 and husband of Veneta. He was born in Moscow, but he lives in Sofia. Tihomir celebrated his 34th birthday in the house - on 17 April, one day after his wife's eviction. A few months after the show, he asked for divorce with Veneta. However, they reunited after a while. He entered the house on Day 1 and finished fifth in the finale on Day 33.

Vasil 

Vasil Boyanov/Azis is one of the most popular pop-folk singers in Bulgaria. He entered the house on Day 1 and left voluntarily on Day 19. He was the only housemate ever to be asked to enter the house again, after walking, but Azis refused. However, two years later he entered the VIP Brother 3 as a guest celebrity housemate on Day 10, where he will spend a week. Azis is the only celebrity to participate in two Vip Brother seasons so far.

Veneta 
Veneta Raykova is a TV host. She was also a member of the secret inquisition during the first season of VIP Brother. She entered the house on Day 1 along with her husband Tihomir (also a participant from Big Brother 1) and was the third evicted on Day 22.

Veselin 
Veselin Danov is an ex-politician. He entered the house on Day 1 and left voluntarily on Day 8.

Zdravko 
Zdravko Vasilev is the winner of Big Brother 1. He entered the house on Day 1, proposing marriage to his girlfriend Hristina (who told him she was pregnant during his stay in Big Brother 1) and was the fourth evicted on Day 26. Later, they both married in the house.

Weekly summary and highlights

Nominations table

The first housemate in each box was nominated for two points, and the second housemate was nominated for one point.

Notes 

 : To prevent conspiration, the first nominations were positive. Each housemate was also able to nominate himself/herself.
 : To prevent conspiration, Big Brother asked each housemate to nominate three people - with 3, 2 and 1 point.
 : Hristina and Veneta saved their lucky eggs, won in a daily task. This task allowed them to nominate one housemate with one extra point. Hristina nominated Vasil with three points, Veneta - Katerina.
 : The nominations were cancelled, because Vasil walked voluntarily.
 : The public was voting for a winner between Desislava, Kalin, Katerina, Nikolay, Magdalena, Tihomir and Hristina. The Housemate with the fewest votes was evicted on Day 29.

References

External links 
 The official website of Vip Brother 2

2007 Bulgarian television seasons
VIP Brother seasons
2007 Bulgarian television series endings